Jan Jonsson may refer to:

Sportspeople
Jan Jonsson (handballer) (born 1948), Swedish handballer
Jan Jönsson (born 1960), Swedish footballer
Jan Jönsson (equestrian) (born 1944), Swedish equestrian
Jan Jonsson (Swedish Air Force officer) (born 1952), Swedish Air Force officer

Others
Jojje Jönsson (|Jan-Ove Jönsson, born 1955), Swedish actor
Jan-Åke Jonsson (born 1951), managing director of Saab Automobile AB